The East Carolinian is the campus newspaper of East Carolina University in Greenville, North Carolina, United States, and is entirely student-run. The East Carolinian dates back to 1925. The ECU Student Media Board "provides oversight and direction to the student newspaper" The newspaper has a circulation of 9,000 copies per issue in the Spring and Fall semesters and 5,000 copies per issue in the Summer.  The newspaper comes out on Tuesdays and Thursdays in the Spring and Fall and on Wednesdays in the Summer.

Operations
The East Carolinian publishes one issues per week in the Fall and Spring semesters and continues publications during the Summer.  The newspaper is printed by Cooke Communications North Carolina, LLC in Greenville, NC.

References

External links
The East Carolinian official website

1925 establishments in North Carolina
Publications established in 1925
East Carolina University
Greenville, North Carolina
Student newspapers published in North Carolina
Weekly newspapers published in North Carolina